KFRlib is an open-source cross-platform C++ DSP framework written in C++.
It is covered by a dual GPL/commercial license.

Official support

Supported platforms
KFR is supported on the following platforms.
 Mac OS X
 Linux
 Microsoft Windows
 iOS
 Android

Supported compilers
 Xcode 6.3 and later
 Clang 3.6 and later
 Visual Studio 2015 using LLVM-vs2014 toolkit

Features
 Optimized for ARM NEON, SSE, SSE2, SSE3, SSSE3, SSE4.1, SSE4.2, AVX, AVX2 instruction sets
 Fast Fourier transform
 Convolution
 Finite impulse response filters
 Infinite impulse response filters
 Digital biquad filter
 Sample rate conversion
 Window function
 Goertzel algorithm
 Digital delay line
 Pseudorandom number generator
 SIMD versions of many C mathematical functions

References

External links 
 Official website
 

C++
C++ libraries
Multimedia software